As of March 2020, Lufthansa including Lufthansa Regional (but excluding all other Lufthansa Group members) operates flights to domestic destinations and international destinations in several countries across Africa, Americas, Asia, and Europe. Overall, Lufthansa serves 211 destinations in 74 countries, including 24 in the United States.

Destinations
The list includes the city, country, and the airport's name, with the airline's hubs marked.

References

External links
 Official website 

Lists of airline destinations
Lufthansa
Star Alliance destinations